Rick Astley is an English singer and songwriter who has received many awards and nominations for his contributions to the music industry.

ASCAP Pop Music Awards
The annual ASCAP Pop Music Awards honors the songwriters and publishers of the most performed pop songs.

|-
| 1992
| "Cry for Help"
| Most Performed Song
|

BBC Music Awards
The BBC Music Awards are the BBC's annual pop music awards, held every December, as a celebration of the musical achievements over the past twelve months. The event is coordinated by the BBC's music division, BBC Music.

|-
| 2016
| 50
| Album of the Year
|

BMI Awards
Broadcast Music, Inc. (BMI) is one of three United States performing rights organizations, along with ASCAP and SESAC. It collects license fees on behalf of songwriters, composers, and music publishers and distributes them as royalties to those members whose works have been performed.

|-
| 1992
| "Cry for Help"
| rowspan=2|Award-Winning Song
| 
|-
| rowspan=2|1994
| rowspan=2|"Hopelessly"
| 
|-
| 1 Million-Air Award
|

Billboard Music Awards
The Billboard Music Awards are sponsored by Billboard magazine to honor artists based on Billboard Year-End Charts. The award ceremony was held from 1990 to 2007, until its reintroduction in 2011. Before and after that time span, winners have been announced by Billboard, both in the press and as part of their year-end issue.

|-
| rowspan=14|1988
| rowspan=10|Himself
| Top Pop Artist
| 
|-
| Top Pop Artist - Male
| 
|-
| Top Pop New Artist
| 
|-
| Top Pop Singles Artist
| 
|-
| Top Pop Singles Artist - Male
| 
|-
| Top Adult Contemporary Artist
| 
|-
| Top Adult Contemporary Artist - Male
| 
|-
| Top Dance Club Play Artist
| 
|-
| Top Dance Club Play Artist - Male
| 
|-
| Top Dance Sales Artist
| 
|-
| rowspan=4|"Never Gonna Give You Up"
| Top Dance Sales 12" Single
| 
|-
| Top Pop Single
| 
|-
| Top Adult Contemporary Single
| 
|-
| Top Dance Club Play Single
|

Brit Awards
The Brit Awards are the British Phonographic Industry's annual pop music awards.

|-
| rowspan=3|1988
| rowspan=2|Himself
| British Breakthrough Act
| 
|-
| British Male Solo Artist
| 
|-
| "Never Gonna Give You Up"
| British Single of the Year
|

Classic Pop Reader Awards
Classic Pop is a monthly British music magazine, which launched in October 2012. It was devised and founded by Ian Peel, who was also editor for the first 19 issues.  Rik Flynn stepped in as editor until Issue 23 followed by current editor Steve Harnell.  Ian Peel remains involved as Founder & Editor-at-Large.

|-
| rowspan=3|2018
| Himself
| Artist of the Year
| 
|-
| rowspan=2|"She Makes Me"
| Single of the Year
| 
|-
| Video of the Year
| 
|-
| 2019
| Himself
| Best Solo Artist
|

AIM Independent Music Awards
The AIM Independent Music Awards, hosted by the Association of Independent Music (AIM), were established in 2011 to recognise artists signed to independent record labels in the United Kingdom. Most of the categories and nominations are selected by an independent judging panel, though some are decided by the public.

|-
|2017
| Himself
| Best Live Act
|

Ivor Novello Awards
The Ivor Novello Awards are presented annually by the British Academy of Songwriters, Composers and Authors and honor songwriting and composing.

|-
| rowspan=4|1988
| rowspan=4|"Never Gonna Give You Up"
| Best Contemporary Song
| 
|-
| International Hit of the Year
| 
|-
| The Best Selling 'A' Side
| 
|-
| Most Performed Work
|

Grammy Awards
The Grammy Awards are awarded annually by the National Academy of Recording Arts and Sciences of the United States for outstanding achievements in the music industry. Often considered the highest music honor, the awards were established in 1958.

|-
| 1989
| Himself
| Best New Artist
|

MTV Europe Music Awards
The MTV Europe Music Awards (EMA) were established in 1994 by MTV Networks Europe to celebrate the most popular music videos in Europe.

|-
| 2008
| Himself
| Best Act Ever
|

Music & Media Year-End Awards
Music & Media was a pan-European magazine for radio, music and entertainment. It was published for the first time in 1984 as Eurotipsheet, but in 1986 it changed name to Music & Media.

!Ref.
|-
| 1987
| "Never Gonna Give You Up"
| Debut Single of the Year
| 
|

Robert Awards
The Robert Award is a Danish film prize awarded each year by the Film Academy of Denmark.

|-
| 2004
| Oh Happy Day
| Best Original Score
|

Smash Hits Poll Winners Party
The Smash Hits Poll Winners Party was an awards ceremony held annually by British magazine Smash Hits, and broadcast on BBC One. Astley has won two awards.

|-
| rowspan=7|1987
| rowspan=3|"Never Gonna Give You Up"
| Best Single
| 
|-
| Worst Single
| 
|-
| Worst Video
| 
|-
| rowspan=17|Himself
| Most Promising New Act
| 
|-
| best Dressed Person
| 
|-
| Worst Male Singer
| 
|-
| rowspan=2|Best Male Singer
| 
|-
| rowspan=8|1988
| 
|-
| Worst Male Solo Singer
| 
|-
| Most Fanciable Male
| 
|-
| Most Completely Useless Person
| 
|-
| Best Dressed Person
| 
|-
| Worst Dressed Person
| 
|-
| Most Very Horrible Thing 
| 
|-
| rowspan=2|Worst Haircut
| 
|-
| rowspan=4|1989
| 
|-
| The Most Completely Useless Person
| 
|-
| Best Male Solo Singer
| 
|-
| rowspan=2|Worst Male Solo Singer
| 
|-
| 1990
|

Virgin Media Music Awards
The Virgin Media Music Awards was the annual music awards run by Virgin Media. The winners was declared on its official site "Virgin Media".

|-
| 2008
| Himself
| Legend of the Year
|

References

Awards
Astley, Rick